The Stylophone is a miniature analog electronic keyboard musical instrument played with a stylus. Invented in 1967 by Brian Jarvis, it entered production in 1968, manufactured by Dubreq.

Some three million Stylophones were sold, mostly as children's toys, but they were occasionally used by professional musicians such as Rolf Harris, John Lennon, Kraftwerk and David Bowie.

Original models
The Stylophone consists of a metal keyboard made of printed circuit board and is played by touching it with a stylus. Each note on the keyboard is connected to a voltage-controlled oscillator via a different-value resistor, and touching the stylus to the keyboard thus closes a circuit. The only other controls are a power switch and a vibrato control on the front panel beside the keyboard, and a tuning potentiometer on the rear.

The Stylophone was available in standard, bass and treble variants, but the standard version was the most common. There was also a larger version called the 350S with more notes on the keyboard, various voices, a novel wah-wah effect that was controlled by moving the hand over a photosensor and two styluses.

In the mid-1970s, a new model appeared that featured simulated wood on the speaker panel and a volume control. However, production of the Stylophone ceased in 1975.

Entertainer Rolf Harris served for several years as the Stylophone's advertising spokesman in the United Kingdom and appeared on many "play-along" records sold by the manufacturer.

2007 revival

In October 2007, 28 years after the Stylophone had ceased production, toy company Re:creation, in conjunction with Dubreq Ltd. (reformed in 2003 by Ben Jarvis, the son of the original inventor), relaunched a Stylophone. The new model, manufactured in China and officially called the S1, is a digital copy that closely resembles the 1960s original but features a volume control, audio throughput and two new sounds.

Stylophone S2
In December 2012, Dubreq released the Series 2 Stylophone, a British-made, true  analogue synthesizer.

Stylophone Beat Box
This model strays from the normal box-shaped Stylophone. It is a mainly round case that has a circular keypad containing 13 contact areas. It offers three sound banks and a tempo control. It also features a basic record/loop function.

Stylophone Gen X-1
In January 2017, Dubreq released details of the Stylophone Gen X-1 portable analogue synthesizer. It was designed and manufactured by Dubreq and retails at £59.99 or €69.99. The Gen X-1 has additional controls for LFO, analog delay, low-pass filter, and envelope settings. It also includes sub-ocatave switches, and an input so it can be used as an effects unit

Stylophone GEN R-8
In 2019, Dubreq announced the Gen R-8, a limited edition, full-analogue, metal-cased Stylophone. This version has features seen on more expensive analogue synthesizers and is considerably larger than the standard model. An initial batch of 500 has been released.

Stylophone Analog Sound S1
In 2020, Dubreq released a replacement for the 2007 S1. The new model is visually similar to its predecessor but has less rounded corners and no auxiliary input. Internally, the digital sampled sounds have been replaced by an analogue oscillator based on a 555 timer IC, and the tone selector offers three octave ranges. The sound is much more similar to that of the 1970s versions.

Bowie Limited Edition
In 2021, Dubreq launched a limited edition version of the Analog S1 as a tribute to the late David Bowie. This model has an all-white finish, has an official Bowie logo moulded into the chromed grille and includes a colour-printed booklet including photos, interviews and tablature for a selection of Bowie's songs.

In popular culture

 One of the earliest uses of the Stylophone in pop music was in the Small Faces song "Donkey Rides, A Penny, A Glass", which was released as the B-side of their single "The Universal" in June 1968.
 John Lennon played a Stylophone during a rehearsal of the George Harrison song "Old Brown Shoe" on 28 January 1969.
David Bowie is credited with playing the Stylophone on his 1969 debut hit song "Space Oddity" and also for his 2002 album Heathen track titled "Slip Away," as well as on the song "Heathen (The Rays)".
Kraftwerk's 1981 song "Pocket Calculator" features the Stylophone among the song's main instruments and ends with a Stylophone solo.
 The 1999 track "Style" (and its several other versions) by Orbital takes its name from the Stylophone, which is used extensively on the track.
Richard Barone uses the Stylophone on numerous recordings, including "Glow" and '"Girl" from his 2010 album Glow. In the latter song, it is played by his producer Tony Visconti.
 The Stylophone is used as a main instrument by Russian rock group .
 British band Pulp use the Stylophone prominently in their song "Styloroc (Nites of Suburbia)", which appears on their 1992 Babies single and 1993 compilation album Intro – The Gift Recordings.
 British electronic music duo Orbital extensively used the Stylophone for their 1999 single Style.
 The 2017 film Baby Driver features the Stylophone.

References

Electronic musical instruments
Keyboard instruments
Toy instruments and noisemakers